This is a list of diseases starting with the letter "G".

Ga

Gal–Gap
 Galactorrhea
 Galactocoele
 Galactokinase deficiency
 Galactorrhea hyperprolactinemia
 Galactosamine-6-sulfatase deficiency
 Galactose-1-phosphate uridylyltransferase deficiency
 Galactosemia
 Galloway Mowat syndrome
 Gamborg–Nielsen syndrome
 Game–Friedman–Paradice syndrome
 Gamma aminobutyric acid transaminase deficiency
 Gamma-cystathionase deficiency
 Gamma-sarcoglycanopathy
 Gamstorp episodic adynamy
 Ganglioglioma
 Gangliosidosis
 Gangliosidosis (Type2)(GM2)
 Gangliosidosis GM1 type 3
 Gangliosidosis type1
 Ganser syndrome
 GAPO syndrome
 Garchichiliosis

Gar–Gau
 Garcia–Torres–Guarner syndrome
 Gardner–Morrisson–Abbot syndrome
 Gardner–Silengo–Wachtel syndrome
 Gardner–Diamond syndrome
 Gardner's syndrome
 Garret–Tripp syndrome
 Gas/bloat syndrome
 Gastric dumping syndrome
 Gastric lymphoma
 Gastritis, familial giant hypertrophic
 Gastrocutaneous syndrome
 Gastroenteritis, eosinophilic
 Gastro-enteropancreatic neuroendocrine tumor
 Gastroenteritis
 Gastroesophageal reflux
 Gastrointestinal autonomic nerve tumor
 Gastrointestinal neoplasm
 Gaucher disease
 Gaucher disease type 1
 Gaucher disease type 2
 Gaucher disease type 3
 Gaucher ichthyosis restrictive dermopathy
 Gaucher-like disease

Gay
 Gay–Feinmesser–Cohen syndrome

Ge

Gee–Gem
 Geen Sandford Davison syndrome
 Gelatinous ascites
 Geleophysic dwarfism
 Gelineau disease
 Geliphobia
 Gemignani syndrome
 Gemss syndrome

Gen–Ger
 Gender dysphoria
 Genée-Wiedemann syndrome
 Generalized anxiety disorder (GAD)
 Generalized malformations in neuronal migration
 Generalized resistance to thyroid hormone
 Generalized seizure
 Generalized torsion dystonia
 Genes syndrome
 Genetic diseases, inborn
 Genetic reflex epilepsy
 Genetic susceptibility to infections caused by BCG
 Genital anomaly cardiomyopathy
 Genital dwarfism, Turner type
 Genital dwarfism
 Genital retraction syndrome (also known as koro)
 Genito palatocardiac syndrome
 Genu valgum, st. Helena familial
 Genu varum
 Genuphobia
 Geographic tongue
 German syndrome
 Germinal cell aplasia
 Gerodermia osteodysplastica
 Gershinibaruch–Leibo syndrome
 Gerstmann syndrome

Ges
 Gestational diabetes mellitus
 Gestational pemphigoid
 Gestational trophoblastic disease

Gh
 Ghosal syndrome
 Ghose–Sachdev–Kumar syndrome

Gi
 Gianotti-Crosti syndrome
 Giant axonal neuropathy
 Giant cell arteritis
 Giant cell myocarditis
 Giant congenital nevi
 Giant ganglionic hyperplasia
 Giant hypertrophic gastritis
 Giant mammary hamartoma
 Giant papillary conjunctivitis
 Giant pigmented hairy nevus
 Giant platelet syndrome
 Giardiasis
 Gibson's Syndrome
 Giedion syndrome
 Gigantism advanced bone age hoarse cry
 Gigantism partial, nevi, hemihypertrophy, macrocephaly
 Gigantism
 Gilbert's syndrome
 Gilles de la Tourette's syndrome
 Gingival fibromatosis dominant
 Gingival fibromatosis facial dysmorphism
 Gingival fibrosis
 Gingivitis
 Gyrate atrophy of the choroid and retina
 Gitelman syndrome
 Gittings syndrome

Gl

Gla–Gli
 Glanzmann thrombasthenia
 Glass–Chapman–Hockley syndrome
 Glaucoma
 Glaucoma ecopia microspherophakia stiff joints short stature
 Glaucoma iridogoniodysgenesia
 Glaucoma sleep apnea
 Glaucoma type 1C
 Glaucoma, congenital
 Glaucoma, hereditary adult type 1A
 Glaucoma, hereditary juvenile type 1B
 Glaucoma, hereditary
 Glaucoma, primary infantile type 3A
 Glaucoma, primary infantile type 3B
 Glioblastoma multiforme
 Glioblastoma
 Glioma
 Gliomatosis cerebri
 Gliosarcoma

Glo
 Globel disaccharide intolerance
 Glomerulonephritis sparse hair telangiectases
 Glomerulonephritis
 Glomerulosclerosis
 Gloomy face syndrome
 Glossodynia
 Glossopalatine ankylosis micrognathia ear anomalies
 Glossopharyngeal neuralgia
 Glossophobia

Glu
 Glucagonoma
 Glucocorticoid deficiency, familial
 Glucocorticoid resistance
 Glucocorticoid sensitive hypertension
 Glucose 6 phosphate dehydrogenase deficiency
 Glucose-6-phosphate translocase deficiency
 Glucose-galactose malabsorption
 Glucosephosphate isomerase deficiency
 Glucosidase acid-1,4-alpha deficiency
 Glut2 deficiency
 Glutamate decarboxylase deficiency
 Glutamate-aspartate transport defect
 Glutaricaciduria I
 Glutaricaciduria II
 Glutaryl-CoA dehydrogenase deficiency
 Glutathione synthetase deficiency

Gly
 Glyceraldehyde-3-phosphate dehydrogenase deficiency
 Glycine synthase deficiency
 Glycogen storage disease
 Glycogen storage disease type 1B
 Glycogen storage disease type 1C
 Glycogen storage disease type 1D
 Glycogen storage disease type 6, due to phosphorylation
 Glycogen storage disease type 7
 Glycogen storage disease type 9
 Glycogen storage disease type II
 Glycogen storage disease type V
 Glycogen storage disease type VI
 Glycogen storage disease type VII
 Glycogen storage disease type VIII
 Glycogenosis
 Glycogenosis type II
 Glycogenosis type III
 Glycogenosis type IV
 Glycogenosis type V
 Glycogenosis type VI
 Glycogenosis type VII
 Glycogenosis type VIII
 Glycogenosis, type 0
 Glycosuria

Gm
 GM2 gangliosidosis, 0 variant
 GM2-gangliosidosis, B, B1, AB variant
 GMS syndrome

Go

Goi–Gon
 Goitre
 Goldberg–Bull syndrome
 Goldberg syndrome
 Goldblatt–Wallis syndrome
 Goldblatt–Wallis–Zieff syndrome
 Goldblatt–Viljoen syndrome
 Goldenhar syndrome
 Goldskag–Cooks–Hertz syndrome
 Goldstein–Hutt syndrome
 Gollop–Coates syndrome
 Gollop syndrome
 Goltz syndrome
 Gombo syndrome
 Gomez and López-Hernández syndrome
 Gonadal dysgenesis
 Gonadal dysgenesis mixed
 Gonadal dysgenesis Turner type
 Gonadal dysgenesis XY type associated anomalies
 Gonadal dysgenesis, XX type
 Gonadal dysgenesis, XY female type
 Goniodysgenesis mental retardation short stature
 Gonococcal conjunctivitis
 Gonzales Del Angel syndrome

Goo–Gou
 Goodman camptodactyly
 Goodpasture pneumorenal syndrome
 Goodpasture's syndrome
 Gordon hyperkaliemia-hypertension syndrome
 Gordon syndrome
 Gorham syndrome
 Gorham's disease
 Gorham–Stout disease
 Gorlin–Bushkell–Jensen syndrome
 Gorlin–Chaudhry–Moss syndrome
 Gottron's syndrome
 Gougerot–Blum syndrome
 Gougerot–Sjogren syndrome
 Gout
 Gouty nephropathy, familial

Gr

Gra–Gri
 Graft versus host disease
 Graham–Boyle–Troxell syndrome
 Grand–Kaine–Fulling syndrome
 Grant syndrome
 Granulocytopenia
 Granuloma annulare
 Granulomas, congenital cerebral
 Granulomatosis, lymphomatoid
 Granulomatous allergic angiitis
 Granulomatous hypophysitis
 Granulomatous rosacea
 Graphite pneumoconiosis
 Graves' disease
 Gray platelet syndrome
 Great vessels transposition
 Greenberg dysplasia
 Greig cephalopolysyndactyly syndrome GCPS
 Griscelli disease
 Grix–Blankenship–Peterson syndrome

Gro–Gru
 Groll–Hirschowitz syndrome
 Grosse syndrome
 Grover's disease
 Growth deficiency brachydactyly unusual facies
 Growth delay, constitutional
 Growth hormone deficiency
 Growth mental deficiency syndrome of Myhre
 Growth retardation alopecia pseudoanodontia optic
 Growth retardation hydrocephaly lung hypoplasia
 Growth retardation mental retardation phalangeal hypoplasia
 Grubben–Decock–Borghgraef syndrome

Gt–Gy
 GTP cyclohydrolase deficiency
 Guanidinoacetate methyltransferase deficiency
 Guérin–Stern syndrome
 Guibaud–Vainsel syndrome
 Guillain–Barré syndrome
 Guizar–Vasquez–Luengas syndrome
 Guizar–Vasquez–Sanchez–Manzano syndrome
 Gunal–Seber–Basaran syndrome
 Gupta–Patton syndrome
 Gurrieri–Sammito–Bellussi syndrome
 Gusher syndrome
 Gymnophobia
 Gynecomastia
 Gyrate atrophy of the retina
 Gyrate atrophy

G